Pilodeudorix pseudoderitas, the sombre diopetes, is a butterfly in the family Lycaenidae. It is found in Ghana, eastern Nigeria, Cameroon, the Republic of the Congo, Angola, the Democratic Republic of the Congo and western Uganda. The habitat consists of forests.

References

Butterflies described in 1964
Deudorigini